Ariel Aufgang, AIA,  is an American architect.

Career 
Aufgang is the principal at Aufgang Architects, a firm with practices in the New York Metropolitan area. A graduate of Rensselaer Polytechnic Institute (RPI) in Troy, NY, with Bachelors in Architecture and a BS in building science degrees, Aufgang is a licensed architect in New York, New Jersey, Connecticut and Georgia.  He is known for designs based on adaptive reuse, luxury apartments, senior living, accessibility and affordable housing. His designs have garnered multiple awards and his firm is one of the ten most prolific in NYC over the past six years.

Aufgang Architects is a New York State and New York City Certified Minority Business Enterprise.

Aufgang is Vice President of the Rockland Community Foundation Board of Directors.

Notable Projects 
 Victoria Theater – adaptive reuse project in Harlem  
 200 Water Street - renovation and conversion of the former Brillo Factory  
 Corn Exchange Bank Building – renovation and expansion in Harlem
 Webster Avenue Commons - affordable housing located in the Bronx and winner of NYSAFAH Project of the Year Award 2016
 Park Lane at Sea View - senior affordable housing located on Staten Island and winner of the NYSAFAH Project of the Year Award in 2010
 The Melody - one of the first buildings to incorporate the NYC Active Design Guidelines / first New York residential building to achieve the LEED innovation credit for physical activity  
 881 Erskine Street, Brooklyn - One of the 4 biggest projects underway in NYC 2017

References 

20th-century American architects
Living people
Rensselaer Polytechnic Institute alumni
21st-century American architects
Year of birth missing (living people)